State Route 200 (SR 200) is a state highway in the U.S. state of California near Arcata in Humboldt County. It is a cut-off connecting U.S. Route 101 and State Route 299.  It runs along the north bank of the Mad River, to the north of the 101-299 junction.

Route description
The road begins with a complex interchange at U.S. Route 101 just north of Arcata, where entrance to US 101 and exit from the freeway are slightly separated. The road then heads eastward through a forested area in the Azalea State Reserve just north of the Mad River. The road continues to parallel the river with various roads branching off it until it reaches its eastern terminus at State Route 299, the Trinity Scenic Byway, with an interchange.

SR 200 is not part of the National Highway System, a network of highways that are considered essential to the country's economy, defense, and mobility by the Federal Highway Administration.

History
CA 200 was the old US 299 (formerly old CA 44).

Major intersections

See also

References

External links

California @ AARoads.com - State Route 200
Caltrans: Route 200 highway conditions
California Highways: SR 200

200
State Route 200